The Destiny module, also known as the U.S. Lab, is the primary operating facility for U.S. research payloads aboard the International Space Station (ISS). It was berthed to the Unity module and activated over a period of five days in February, 2001. Destiny is NASA's first permanent operating orbital research station since Skylab was vacated in February 1974.

The Boeing Company began construction of the  research laboratory in 1995 at the Michoud Assembly Facility and then the Marshall Space Flight Center in Huntsville, Alabama. Destiny was shipped to the Kennedy Space Center in Florida in 1998, and was turned over to NASA for pre-launch preparations in August 2000.

Astronauts work inside the pressurized facility to conduct research in numerous scientific fields. Scientists throughout the world would use the results to enhance their studies in medicine, engineering, biotechnology, physics, materials science, and Earth science.

Launch and installation

Destiny was launched to ISS aboard the Space Shuttle mission STS-98. On February 10, 2001 at 9:50 am CST, the installation of Destiny began. First, the Shuttle SRMSS (CanadaArm) was used to remove Pressurized Mating Adapter 2 (PMA 2) from Unity node's forward port to make room for the new module. PMA-2 was temporarily stowed on the forward berthing ring of the Z1 truss. Destiny was "grabbed" by the robotic arm at 11:23, lifted out of Atlantis cargo bay, and berthed to the forward port of Unity. Two days later, PMA-2 was moved to its semi-permanent location on the forward hatch of Destiny. (See also Pressurized Mating Adapter and Z1 Truss.) Several years later, on November 14, 2007, the Harmony module was attached to the forward end of the Destiny laboratory.

The addition of Destiny increased the habitable volume by 3,800 cubic feet, an increase of 41 percent.

Laboratory structure 

It is made from aluminum and stainless steel, and comprises three cylindrical sections and two endcones that contain the hatch openings through which astronauts enter and exit the module. The aft port of Destiny is connected to the forward port of Unity, and the forward port of Destiny is connected to the aft port of Harmony. The ends are colored blue and white respectively for the crew to navigate easily. A -diameter window is located on one side of the center module segment.

Each of the two berthing ports on Destiny contains a hatch. Both hatches are normally open, and remain open unless a situation arises requiring a module to be isolated. Each hatch has a window. The hatches can be opened or closed from either side. The hatches have a pressure interlock feature, which prevents the hatch from being opened if there is a negative pressure across the hatch (higher pressure on the outside of the hatch). The hatch openings are a square-like six sided shape - which is associated to that module.

Destiny has a  optically pure, telescope-quality glass window located in an open rack bay used primarily for Earth science observations. Station crewmembers use very high quality video and still cameras at the window to record Earth's changing landscapes. A window shutter protects the window from potential micrometeoroid and orbital debris strikes during the life of the ISS. The crew manually opens the shutter to use the window.

Imagery captured from Destinys window has given geologists and meteorologists the chance to study floods, avalanches, fires and ocean events such as plankton blooms in a way never seen before, as well as given international scientists the opportunity to study features such as glaciers, coral reefs, urban growth and wild fires.

Specifications

Length: 
Diameter: 
Mass: 
Pressurized Volume:

Equipment

As with the European and Japanese laboratories of the station, payloads inside Destiny are configured around International Standard Payload Racks (ISPRs), that can be removed or reconfigured for various experiments and equipment.

Destiny arrived at the station pre-configured with five racks housing electrical and life support systems that provide electrical power, cooling water, air revitalization, and temperature and humidity control. Seven additional racks were flown to Destiny in the Leonardo Multi-Purpose Logistics Module by STS-102, and ten more were delivered on subsequent missions. Destiny can hold up to 13 payload racks with experiments in human life science, materials research, Earth observations and commercial applications. The laboratory has a total of 24 racks inside the laboratory, six on each side.

Internal to the laboratory are racks, rack stand-offs, and vestibule jumpers. The lab racks house the system hardware in removable modular units. The stand-offs provide space for electrical connections, data management systems cabling for computers, air conditioning ducts, thermal control tubes and more, all of which support the space station's equipment racks. The racks interface to the piping and wiring in the standoff via outlets and ports located in the standoffs at the base end of each rack location.

Jumpers in the vestibule, the area between Unity and Destiny, connect the piping and wiring between the two. Grounding straps between Unity and Destiny will be installed. One side of the grounding strap will be connected to the Active Common Berthing Mechanism (ACBM) on Unity, while the other end will be connected to the Passive Common Berthing Mechanism (PCBM) on Destiny.

Some of the mechanisms on Destiny are the CBMs (passive and active), hatches, and the laboratory window shutter. The ACBM is in the forward port of the laboratory. It is attached to the Harmony node. The PCBM on Destiny is located in the laboratory's aft port. The ACBM in Unity's forward port is latched to the laboratory's PCBM to berth Destiny to Unity.

Science equipment

Destiny also contains the Minus Eighty Degree Laboratory Freezer for ISS (MELFI), transported to the Space Station on STS-121. The freezer is used both to store samples and reagents on the station, and to transport them to and from the space station in a temperature controlled environment.

Currently installed at the main observation window of Destiny is the Agricultural Camera (AgCam). It is a multi-spectral imaging system built and primarily operated by students and faculty at the University of North Dakota. Its purpose is to take frequent images, in visible and infrared light, of vegetated areas on the Earth and promises to deliver a greater effectiveness for in-season agriculture applications research and operational decision support than current satellite systems such as Landsat.

Veggie

In 2016 the ISS crew operated Veg-03 experiment. In November they harvested a crop of edible romaine lettuce which contributed to the crew's meal. Also samples of cabbage are returned to Earth for testing as part of the experiment. This uses the Veggie experiment module in Destiny, which can provide light and nutrients for plant growth experiments.

Destiny nadir window

The nadir window is formally known as the U.S. Laboratory Science Window, has the "...highest quality optics ever flown on a human occupied spacecraft...", according to NASA, and can support taking Earth observations/images. In 2010 a research facility was brought to the station, called WORF, and the first photo with it was taken in January 2011. WORF was delivered by ISS Flight 19A (which was STS-131) .

WORF

In 2010 the WORF was brought to ISS aboard STS-131 and installed. This is a facility that uses the Destiny nadir window to support various types of photography and observation. WORF, which stands for Window Observational Research Facility is constructed based on International Standard Payload Rack (ISPR) and EXPRESS Rack program technology. The first photo taken by WORF was on January 21, 2011 with Ag Cam.

The name WORF is an allusion to Worf, the fictional character of the same name who appeared in the science fiction television and film franchise Star Trek. A special mission patch for WORF was issued that featured text written in the Klingon language. Another cross-over of the Star Trek franchise and space exploration was the naming of Space Shuttle Enterprise.

A similar window is Nauka module's porthole window.

In media
 The module Destiny is featured in the 2013 film Gravity.
 The module, identified as "the 2001 module Destiny", was originally intended to be the small section of Alpha (the future name of the ISS) used as a throne at the end of the 2017 film Valerian and the City of a Thousand Planets and covers this role in the novelization, but, in the final shooting of the film, it was replaced by the Apollo Command/Service Module Destiny 2005, modified with artificial gravity and a speakerphone-like radio system.

See also

After its installation, habitation and use of Destiny is similar to ISS history as an integrated part of that Space station:
List of ISS Expeditions
List of International Space Station crew
List of International Space Station visitors
List of human spaceflights to the ISS

References

External links

NASA - Destiny

 
Components of the International Space Station
Laboratories
Spacecraft launched in 2001
Spacecraft launched by the Space Shuttle